"Spirit Inspiration" is a single by the Japanese rock band Nothing's Carved in Stone released on November 28, 2012. The music was used as the first opening theme for the anime series Blast of Tempest.

Track listing

References 

2012 singles
2012 songs
Epic Records singles
Anime songs